Bancroft County, Iowa was a county located in what today is the northern portion of Kossuth County. The county was established in 1851 by the Iowa General Assembly, but then abolished six years later in 1857 and the area joined to Kossuth County, leading to it being roughly twice the size of adjacent counties.  It became part of Kossuth because the area was wetland, thereby making it unsuitable for farming.

The county was named for historian and statesman George Bancroft (1800–1891).

There never was a county seat established or the organization of a county government.

See also
Crocker County, Iowa, another county created out of the same area of Kossuth County.

References

Geography of Iowa
Former counties of Iowa
Kossuth County, Iowa
1851 establishments in Iowa
1857 disestablishments in Iowa